Loveaholic ( or Khoht-rak-eng-loei)  is a 2006 Thai romantic comedy film directed by Ping Lumpraploeng and starring Thai comedian Udom Taephanit.

Synopsis 

Rong, a comedy screenwriter, finds out his wife, Daeng, has had an affair with a physician. Rong's and Daeng's relationship had grown routine and boring, which was why Daeng had the affair. Rong quarrels with Daeng, who angrily drives away in her car. Later, Rong is told that his wife is dead. Grieving, he blames himself for her death. However, Rong notices that many things in the house are being moved around, and he starts to think that perhaps Daeng is not dead.

Cast 
 Udom Taephanit as Rong
 Wisa Saansaat as Daeng
 Akara Amarttayakul as Raksa
 Achita Sikamana as Suay
 Ping Lumpraploeng

External links 
 

2006 films
2006 romantic comedy films
Thai-language films
Sahamongkol Film International films
Thai romantic comedy films